The International Mathematical Olympiad (IMO) is a mathematical olympiad for pre-university students, and is the oldest of the International Science Olympiads. It is one of the most prestigious mathematical competitions in the world. The first IMO was held in Romania in 1959. It has since been held annually, except in 1980. More than 100 countries, representing over 90% of the world's population. Each country send team of up to six students, plus one team leader, one deputy leader, and observers.

The content ranges from extremely difficult algebra and pre-calculus problems to problems on branches of mathematics not conventionally covered in secondary or high school and often not at university level either, such as projective and complex geometry, functional equations, combinatorics, and well-grounded number theory, of which extensive knowledge of theorems is required. Calculus, though allowed in solutions, is never required, as there is a principle that anyone with a basic understanding of mathematics should understand the problems, even if the solutions require a great deal more knowledge. Supporters of this principle claim that this allows more universality and creates an incentive to find elegant, deceptively simple-looking problems which nevertheless require a certain level of ingenuity, often times a great deal of ingenuity to net all points for a given IMO problem.

The selection process differs by country, but it often consists of a series of tests which admit fewer students at each progressing test. Awards are given to approximately the top-scoring 50% of the individual contestants. Teams are not officially recognized—all scores are given only to individual contestants, but team scoring is unofficially compared more than individual scores. Contestants must be under the age of 20 and must not be registered at any tertiary institution. Subject to these conditions, an individual may participate any number of times in the IMO.

History

The first IMO was held in Romania in 1959. Since then it has been held every year (except in 1980. That year, it was cancelled due to internal strife in Mongolia) It was initially founded for eastern European member countries of the Warsaw Pact, under the USSR bloc of influence, but later other countries participated as well. Because of this eastern origin, the IMOs were first hosted only in eastern European countries, and gradually spread to other nations.

Sources differ about the cities hosting some of the early IMOs. This may be partly because leaders and students are generally housed at different locations, and partly because after the competition the students were sometimes based in multiple cities for the rest of the IMO. The exact dates cited may also differ, because of leaders arriving before the students, and at more recent IMOs the IMO Advisory Board arriving before the leaders.

Several students, such as Lisa Sauermann, Reid W. Barton, Nicușor Dan and Ciprian Manolescu have performed exceptionally well in the IMO, winning multiple gold medals. Others, such as Terence Tao, Grigori Perelman, Ngô Bảo Châu and Maryam Mirzakhani have gone on to become notable mathematicians. Several former participants have won awards such as the Fields Medal.

Scoring and format
The competition consists of 6 problems. The competition is held over two consecutive days with 3 problems each; each day the contestants have four-and-a-half hours to solve three problems. Each problem is worth 7 points for a maximum total score of 42 points. Calculators are not allowed.  The problems chosen are from various areas of secondary school mathematics, broadly classifiable as geometry, number theory, algebra, and combinatorics. They require no knowledge of higher mathematics such as calculus and analysis, and solutions are often elementary. However, they are usually disguised so as to make the solutions difficult. The problems given in the IMO are largely designed to require creativity and the ability to solve problems quickly. Thus, the prominently featured problems are algebraic inequalities, complex numbers, and construction-oriented geometrical problems, though in recent years, the latter has not been as popular as before because of the algorithmic use of theorems like Muirhead's Inequality, and Complex/Analytic Bash to solve problems.

Each participating country, other than the host country, may submit suggested problems to a Problem Selection Committee provided by the host country, which reduces the submitted problems to a shortlist. The team leaders arrive at the IMO a few days in advance of the contestants and form the IMO Jury which is responsible for all the formal decisions relating to the contest, starting with selecting the six problems from the shortlist. The Jury aims to order the problems so that the order in increasing difficulty is Q1, Q4, Q2, Q5, Q3 and Q6, where the First day problems Q1, Q2, and Q3 are in increasing difficulty, and the Second day problems Q4, Q5, Q6 are in increasing difficulty. The Team Leaders of all countries are given the problems in advance of the contestants, and thus, are kept strictly separated and observed.

Each country's marks are agreed between that country's leader and deputy leader and coordinators provided by the host country (the leader of the team whose country submitted the problem in the case of the marks of the host country), subject to the decisions of the chief coordinator and ultimately a jury if any disputes cannot be resolved.

Selection process

The selection process for the IMO varies greatly by country. In some countries, especially those in East Asia, the selection process involves several tests of a difficulty comparable to the IMO itself. The Chinese contestants go through a camp. In others, such as the United States, possible participants go through a series of easier standalone competitions that gradually increase in difficulty. In the United States, the tests include the American Mathematics Competitions, the American Invitational Mathematics Examination, and the United States of America Mathematical Olympiad, each of which is a competition in its own right. For high scorers in the final competition for the team selection, there also is a summer camp, like that of China.

In countries of the former Soviet Union and other eastern European countries, a team has in the past been chosen several years beforehand, and they are given special training specifically for the event. However, such methods have been discontinued in some countries.

Awards
The participants are ranked based on their individual scores. Medals are awarded to the highest ranked participants; slightly fewer than half of them receive a medal. The cutoffs (minimum scores required to receive a gold, silver, or bronze medal respectively) are then chosen so that the numbers of gold, silver and bronze medals awarded are approximately in the ratios 1:2:3. Participants who do not win a medal but who score 7 points on at least one problem receive an honorable mention.

Special prizes may be awarded for solutions of outstanding elegance or involving good generalisations of a problem. This last happened in 1995 (Nikolay Nikolov, Bulgaria) and 2005 (Iurie Boreico), but was more frequent up to the early 1980s. The special prize in 2005 was awarded to Iurie Boreico, a student from Moldova, for his solution to Problem 3, a three variable inequality.

The rule that at most half the contestants win a medal is sometimes broken if it would cause the total number of medals to deviate too much from half the number of contestants. This last happened in 2010 (when the choice was to give either 226 (43.71%) or 266 (51.45%) of the 517 contestants (excluding the 6 from North Korea — see below) a medal), 2012 (when the choice was to give either 226 (41.24%) or 277 (50.55%) of the 548 contestants a medal), and 2013, when the choice was to give either 249 (47.16%) or 278 (52.65%) of the 528 contestants a medal. In these cases, slightly more than half the contestants were awarded a medal.

Penalties
North Korea was disqualified twice for cheating, once at the 32nd IMO in 1991 and again at the 51st IMO in 2010. It is the only country to have been accused of cheating.

Summary

Notable achievements

The following nations have achieved the highest team score in the respective competition:

 China, 23 times: in 1989, 1990, 1992, 1993, 1995, 1997, 1999 (joint), 2000, 2001, 2002, 2004, 2005, 2006, 2008, 2009, 2010, 2011, 2013, 2014, 2019 (joint), 2020, 2021, 2022;
 Russia (including Soviet Union), 16 times: in 1963, 1964, 1965, 1966, 1967, 1972, 1973, 1974, 1976, 1979, 1984, 1986 (joint), 1988, 1991, 1999 (joint), 2007;
 United States, 8 times: in 1977, 1981, 1986 (joint), 1994, 2015, 2016, 2018, 2019 (joint);
 Hungary, 6 times: in 1961, 1962, 1969, 1970, 1971, 1975;
 Romania, 5 times: in 1959, 1978, 1985, 1987, 1996;
 West Germany, twice: in 1982 and 1983;
 South Korea, twice: in 2012 and 2017;
 Bulgaria, once: in 2003;
 Iran, once: in 1998;
 East Germany, once: in 1968.

The following nations have achieved an all-members-gold IMO with a full team:

 China, 14 times: in 1992, 1993, 1997, 2000, 2001, 2002, 2004, 2006, 2009, 2010, 2011, 2019, 2021 and 2022.
 United States, 4 times: in 1994, 2011, 2016, and 2019.
 South Korea, 3 times: in 2012, 2017, and 2019.
 Russia, twice: in 2002 and 2008.
 Bulgaria, once: in 2003.

The only countries to have their entire team score perfectly in the IMO were the United States in 1994 (they were coached by Paul Zeitz), China in 2022, and Luxembourg, whose 1-member team had a perfect score in 1981. The US's success earned a mention in TIME Magazine. Hungary won IMO 1975 in an unorthodox way when none of the eight team members received a gold medal (five silver, three bronze). Second place team East Germany also did not have a single gold medal winner (four silver, four bronze).

Several individuals have consistently scored highly and/or earned medals on the IMO: Zhuo Qun Song (Canada) is the most highly decorated participant with five gold medals (including one perfect score in 2015) and one bronze medal. Reid Barton (United States) was the first participant to win a gold medal four times (1998–2001). Barton is also one of only eight four-time Putnam Fellows (2001–04). Christian Reiher (Germany), Lisa Sauermann (Germany), Teodor von Burg (Serbia), Nipun Pitimanaaree (Thailand) and Luke Robitaille (United States) are the only other participants to have won four gold medals (2000–03, 2008–11, 2009–12, 2010–13, 2011–14, and 2019–22 respectively); Reiher also received a bronze medal (1999), Sauermann a silver medal (2007), von Burg a silver medal (2008) and a bronze medal (2007), and Pitimanaaree a silver medal (2009). Wolfgang Burmeister (East Germany), Martin Härterich (West Germany), Iurie Boreico (Moldova), and Lim Jeck (Singapore) are the only other participants besides Reiher, Sauermann, von Burg, and Pitimanaaree to win five medals with at least three of them gold. Ciprian Manolescu (Romania) managed to write a perfect paper (42 points) for gold medal more times than anybody else in the history of the competition, doing it all three times he participated in the IMO (1995, 1996, 1997). Manolescu is also a three-time Putnam Fellow (1997, 1998, 2000). Eugenia Malinnikova (Soviet Union) is the highest-scoring female contestant in IMO history. She has 3 gold medals in IMO 1989 (41 points), IMO 1990 (42) and IMO 1991 (42), missing only 1 point in 1989 to precede Manolescu's achievement.

Terence Tao (Australia) participated in IMO 1986, 1987 and 1988, winning bronze, silver and gold medals respectively. He won a gold medal when he just turned thirteen in IMO 1988, becoming the youngest person to receive a gold medal (Zhuo Qun Song of Canada also won a gold medal at age 13, in 2011, though he was older than Tao). Tao also holds the distinction of being the youngest medalist with his 1986 bronze medal, followed by 2009 bronze medalist Raúl Chávez Sarmiento (Peru), at the age of 10 and 11 respectively. Representing the United States, Noam Elkies won a gold medal with a perfect paper at the age of 14 in 1981. Both Elkies and Tao could have participated in the IMO multiple times following their success, but entered university and therefore became ineligible.

Medals (1959–2022)
The current ten countries with the best all-time results are as follows:

Gender gap and the launch of EGMO
Over the years, since its inception to present, the IMO has attracted far more male contestants than female contestants. During the period 2000–2021, there were only 1,102 female contestants (9.2%) out of a total of 11,950 contestants. The gap is even more significant in terms of IMO gold medallists; from 1959 to 2021, there were 43 female and 1295 male gold medal winners.

This gender gap in participation and in performance at the IMO level led to the establishment of the European Girls' Mathematical Olympiad (EGMO).

Media coverage
 A documentary, "Hard Problems: The Road To The World's Toughest Math Contest" was made about the United States 2006 IMO team.
 A BBC documentary titled Beautiful Young Minds aired July 2007 about the IMO.
 A BBC fictional film titled X+Y released in September 2014 tells the story of an autistic boy who took part in the Olympiad.
 A book named Countdown by Steve Olson tells the story of the United States team's success in the 2001 Olympiad.

See also
List of International Mathematical Olympiads
International Mathematics Competition for University Students (IMC)
International Science Olympiad
List of mathematics competitions
Pan-African Mathematics Olympiads
 Junior Science Talent Search Examination
Art of Problem Solving

Notes

Citations

References

External links
Official IMO web site
Archive to the IMO 1959–2003 problems and solutions
Old central IMO web site

 
Mathematics competitions
Recurring events established in 1959
International Science Olympiad